SM Culture & Contents (SM C&C) is a South Korean advertising, production, travel and talent company under SM Studios, a wholly-owned subsidiary of SM Entertainment. The company operates as a talent agency, television content production company, theatrical production company and travel company.

History

1987–2012: Establishment and acquisition by SM Entertainment 
After being listed on the KOSDAQ in April 2006 through a merger and acquisition with Volvik, a professional golf ball brand, Intercontinental Travel Agency changed its name to BT&I as part of establishing a "more professional" corporate image. On July 11, 2007, Daum Communications announced that it has signed a contract with BT&I  to transfer shares and management rights of Tour Express, an online travel agency established in 1999. The company reported that it purchased 90 percent of its shares in Tour Express for eight point six billion won from Daum and Tiger Fund, with Daum handing over 55.27 percent of its 65.27 percent stake in Tour Express for 5.3 billion won. It will be able to expand its business into the online travel market and secure the exclusive right to operate a travel site on the Daum portal in the future. On July 5, 2010, BT&I announced that Hotel Trees, which operates a hotel reservation system globally that a system that can provide "high-quality total travel services" linked to aviation and accommodation, has been incorporated as a subsidiary of the company.

On April 13, 2012, Kim Young-min, the former chief executive officer of SM Entertainment, held a board meeting and announced that it has decided to acquire BT&I by acquiring old and new shares of the company. By April 16, it was reported that the company implemented a third-party allocated capital increase for a total of 2,031.75 million won to SM in order to raise operating funds. It also decided to issue two billion won worth of new equity bond with a maturity rate of four percent until April 13, 2015. SM signed a stock transfer agreement to acquire a total of 3,174,010 shares on BT&I at 1,375 won per share and 43,640,263,750 won in total. Additionally, SM intended to "maximize synergy" between the company's existing tourism, leisure, and travel businesses, with Hallyu and K-pop contents.

On May 29, 2012, it held a general meeting of shareholders to appoint directors, auditors, and change the articles of association; the largest shareholder of the company will be changed from the existing Kang Soo-jung and Song Ki-han to SM. The entertainment company planned to pursue drama production and global video content business in "earnest" through the acquisition of BT&I; while, the remaining business of the company will be promoted by combining it with SM's existing businesses along with the "rapid spreading" of Korean Wave and K-pop fever. On August 17, Kang Ho-dong signed an exclusive contract with now SM Culture & Contents, accompanied by the plans to resume broadcasting activities and to show further improvement through cooperation with the company's management and SM. Moreover, Shin Dong-yup also signed an exclusive contract with the company, stating that he will show different sides through "new and diverse programs" that will create "synergy" with Asia's top singers and actors. With the recruitment of Kang and Shin, SM Entertainment Group has expanded not only the management of existing singers and actors, but also the production of MC management, dramas, and comprehensive broadcasting programs, completing the foundation for becoming a comprehensive entertainment group.

On September 19, 2012, SM C&C stated on a press release that it have merged with AM Entertainment, expanding the company's video and actor management business that will target the Asian market.

2013–2016: Mergers and contract signing 
On January 13, 2013, Gong Hyun-jin signed an exclusive contract with SM C&C and is expected to play as a multi-entertainer in various fields, including dramas, movies and entertainment programs, based on its "systematic and global" management support. On March 14, the company absorbed and merged with Hoon Media at a ratio of 1 to 5.2433197 to increase management efficiency, with a total of 534,889 shares issued. Hoon Media was founded by producer Lee Hoon-hee, who organized and directed a number of entertainment programs such as KBS 2TV's Happy Together, Happy Sunday, Fly Shoot Dori, and Music Bank.

Divisions 
SM C&C divided into four division:
 Advertising division
Launched as SM C&C from SK Planet M&C (includes SM Entertainment Group)

Location: 416, HanGang-daero, Jung-gu, Seoul, Republic of Korea
 Production division
Location: 48-6, Sangamsan-ro, Mapo-gu, Seoul, Korea
 Management division
Location: 648, Samseong-ro, Gangnam-gu, Seoul, Korea (Main Headquarters)
 Travel division
Location: 20, Mugyo-ro, Jung-gu, Seoul, Korea

Artists
All names listed are adapted from SM Culture & Contents' artist page of its official website.

Actors and actresses 

 Bae Da-bin
 Choi Yeon-woo
 Hwang Shin-hye
 Hwang Zia
 Jang Yoo-sang
 Kim Ga-vin
 Kim Jae-bum
 Kim Kwan-soo
 Kim Ji-min
 Kim Su-ro
 Kim Su-yeon
 Lee Hak-joo
 Lee Kyung-hwa
 Lee Na-yoon
 Na Yoon-chan
 Park Jin
 Shim So-young
 Sung Tae-joon
 Yu Seung-Mok
 Yoon Je-moon
 Yoon Na-moo

Entertainers 

 Defconn
 Han Suk-joon
 Jang Ye-won
 Jun Hyun-moo
 Kang Ho-dong
 Kim Byung-man
 Kim Jun-hyun
 Kim Min-ah
 Kim Tae-hyun
 Lee Hye-sung
 Lee Jin-ho
 Lee Soo-geun
 Lee Yong-jin
 Park Sun-young
 Seo Jang-hoon
 Shin Dong-yup
 Yang Se-chan

Former artists

Former actors

 Han Chae-young (2013–2015)
 Han Ji-min (2012–2013)
 Gong Hyung-jin (2013–2015)
 Jang Dong-gun (2012–2018)
 Jung So-min (2013–2017)
 Kang Ye-won (2013–2018)
 Kim Ha-neul (2012–2018)
 Kim Shi-hoo (2012–2018)
 Moon Ga-young (2012–2018)
 Oh Jung-yeon (2015–2020)
 Park Sung-kwang (2017-2023)
 Ryu Dam (2012–2017)
 Song Jae-rim (2012–2018)
 Yoon So-hee (2012–2018)

Production works
Sources:

Dramas

Television series

Films

Variety shows

Documentary 
 3D, 4K, UHD Sacred Space: International Joint Production between Korea and France
 Documentary of Artist Lee, Dong Woo: See-Saw (2016–present)
 Documentary of Artist Jang Dong-gun: Be Giving

Musical theatre
 SACRED SPACES Buddhist Temple Korea (2013)
 Singin' in the Rain (2014)
 Hero in My Heart (2014)
 School Oz Hologram musical (2015)
 In the Heights (2015)
 Christmas in August

Notes

References

External links

Related companies and/or services
 SMTOWN Travel (redirected from BT&I's homepage, btnikorea.com)
 SM GLOBAL PACKAGE
 Tour Express
 HotelTrees.com

Entertainment companies established in 1987
South Korean companies established in 1987
SM Entertainment subsidiaries
Companies listed on KOSDAQ
Advertising agencies of South Korea
Talent agencies of South Korea
Television production companies of South Korea
Travel and holiday companies of South Korea